American Radical: The Trials of Norman Finkelstein is a 2009 documentary film about the life of the American academic Norman Finkelstein, directed and produced by David Ridgen and Nicolas Rossier. The documentary features Finkelstein and several of his supporters and opponents, including Noam Chomsky and Alan Dershowitz.

Reception
The film made its world premiere in Chicago as part of the 2009 IFP Chicago Underground Film Festival and won the audience choice award for best documentary. It was shown at the Sheffield Doc/Fest, IDFA in Amsterdam and Hot Docs in Toronto. It won the Cinema Politica Audience Award in 2010. Jerusalem Film Festival describes the work of the filmmakers as: "the most talked-about documentary films of the last months, a fascinating portrait that confidently walks that tightrope known as balance". The film had its television premiere on Yes Television in Israel in May 2010. In April 2011, the film aired on Al Jazeera English worldwide and in the United States on Link TV and selected PBS stations.

Reviews
In February 2010, the film opened in New York and received 100% freshness ratings on Rotten Tomatoes, using data from 222 ratings and 11 reviewers. Despite the many controversies surrounding Norman Finkelstein, major national Jewish publications such as The Jewish Daily Forward, Jewish Week and the Jewish Telegraphic Agency reviewed the film favorably. According to the distributor's website, the film has also received endorsements from personalities such as Mark Achbar, Michael Moore, historian Charles Glass and Canadian-born actor Saul Rubinek. The film was invited to join the collection of the Oscars's library in June 2010.

References

External links
 
American Radical: The Trials of Norman Finkelstein – Al Jazeera English 
 Interview with the directors David Ridgen and Nicolas Rossier in Art Threat
 
 
 American Radical from Typecast Films.com
 IDFA Festival page
 American Radical, review in The New York Times.
 , review in 'Time Out New York".
 , review in The Jewish Daily Forward.
 Interview with director Nicolas Rossier at Documentary Blog

2009 films
Documentary films about public opinion
2009 documentary films
American documentary films
Documentary films about American politics
Documentary films about Jews and Judaism in the United States
Norman Finkelstein
2000s English-language films
2000s American films